Fahimeh Rastkar ( – ) was an Iranian actress and dubbing artist.

She died on 22 November 2012 of Alzheimer's disease in Tehran.

Partial filmography
 Moguls, 1973
 The Finishing Line, 1985
 Love and Death, 1989
 Psycho, 1997
 A Girl Called Thunder, 2000.

References

External links
 

1934 births
2012 deaths
People from Tehran
Iranian film actresses
Iranian stage actresses
Iranian voice actresses
Iranian television actresses